The Popular Socialist Party (PSP) was a communist party in Cuba. It was founded in 1925 as the Cuban Communist Party by Blas Roca Calderio, Anibal Escalante, Fabio Grobart, Alfonso Bernal del Riesgo, and Julio Antonio Mella. Mella acted as the party's leader until his assassination in Mexico in 1929. It was later renamed the Communist Revolutionary Union in 1939.

The party published the daily newspaper  ("Today") until 1950.

History 
The party was founded in 1925 with the help of Soviet officials. It immediately became the Cuban representative for the Comintern and would remain a member until the Comintern's dissolution in 1943.

The party supported the first presidency of Fulgencio Batista from 1940 to 1944, primarily due to his early advocacy of strengthening labour laws and labour unions, as well as his pro-American stance during World War II. As a result, two of the party's leaders, Juan Marinello Vidaurreta and Carlos Rafael Rodríguez, were successively appointed ministers without portfolio.

The party formed an alliance with the Orthodox Party in the 1944 general elections, but was defeated by the Auténticos-Republican alliance, winning only four seats in the House of Representatives. They went on to win five seats in the 1946 mid-term elections.

In the 1948 general election, the party put forward Juan Marinello as its presidential candidate. While he finished fourth, the party won five seats in the House elections. They later won four in the 1950 mid-term elections.   

The  government under President Carlos Prío Socarrás banned the party's daily newspaper, in 1950. Following Fulgencio Batista's 1952 coup d'état, the party itself was banned, but it managed to continue publishing its newspaper.

The party was initially critical of Fidel Castro. In 1961, the party merged into the Integrated Revolutionary Organizations (ORI), the precursor to the current Communist Party of Cuba.

References

Citations

Sources

Books

Journal articles 

 
 

 
1925 establishments in Cuba